The Zen of Python is a collection of 19 "guiding principles" for writing computer programs that influence the design of the Python programming language. Software engineer Tim Peters wrote this set of principles and posted it on the Python mailing list in 1999. Peters's list left open a 20th principle "for Guido to fill in", referring to Guido van Rossum, the original author of the Python language. The vacancy for a 20th principle has not been filled.

Peters's Zen of Python was included as entry number 20 in the language's official Python Enhancement Proposals and was released into the public domain. It is also included as an Easter egg in the Python interpreter, where it can be displayed by entering import this.

In May 2020, Barry Warsaw wrote the lyrics to music.

Principles
The principles are listed as follows:

See also 
 Convention over configuration
 There's more than one way to do it

Notes

References

External links 
 PEP20 on Python website

2004 essays
Essays about computing
Programming principles
Python (programming language)